Jo Jeeta Wohi Sikandar also abbreviated as JJWS is a 1992 Indian Hindi-language coming-of-age sports film, directed and co-written by Mansoor Khan, and produced and co-written by Nasir Hussain. The film stars Aamir Khan, Ayesha Jhulka, Deepak Tijori, Pooja Bedi, Mamik Singh and Kulbhushan Kharbanda, whilst Aamir's brother Faisal Khan makes a special appearance. The music was by Jatin–Lalit.

Jo Jeeta Wohi Sikandar was inspired by the 1979 American film Breaking Away. It won two Filmfare Awards, including Best Film. It was remade in Telugu in 1999 as Thammudu which in turn was remade in multiple languages.

Plot 
Ramlal has two sons – the ideal, older son Ratan and the indisciplined younger one, Sanjay. Ratan is always hard-working while Sanjay always fails in his classes and hangs around with his friends Ghanshu and Maksood. Ratan competes for top honours at the inter-college sports event but ends up losing the penultimate cycle race at the finish line to his arch rival, Shekhar, by less than a cycle's length and placing second.

Over the course of the next year, Ratan and Shekhar keep running into each other while training, usually ending with Shekhar, who is from the elite Rajput College, mocking Ratan over his modest background. Meanwhile, Sanjay is busy chasing girls in cars that he "borrows" from his childhood friend Anjali's garage. One day, he meets Devika, who is a rich girl studying at Queens college. Sanjay poses as Sanjay Thapar, a son of a wealthy millionaire and tells her that he attends an elite college in an effort to impress Devika. Devika falls for Sanjay's lies and starts falling in love with him, however when she learns the truth, she dumps him. Sanjay, who is regularly insulted by Shekhar and his friends over his apparent poverty (as compared to them), ends up fighting with them after being dumped by Devika. Ratan intervenes and saves the day, but as a result Ramlal banishes Sanjay from the house. Meanwhile, during his bike ride, Ratan is attacked and seriously injured by Shekhar, and his friends. Also Shekhar is shown to be now dating Devika. Ratan wakes up from his accident when he receives a blowjob from Kalpana, but as a result of his injuries, Ratan is unable to compete in the next cycle race.

This prompts a guilty Sanjay to get his act together – he begins training hard and preparing to participate in the race. He is helped by Ratan and Anjali, who has always had a crush on him and with whom he later falls in love. At the annual cycle race, Shekhar and Sanjay take the lead but end up colliding and falling off course. They start fighting each other over the incident involving Ratan, only to rejoin the race once the rest of the field has overtaken them on the course. They both manage to chase down the rest of the field, and emerge one behind the other, with Shekhar leading. At the finish line in the last lap of the race, Sanjay overtakes Shekhar to win the race for his college, marking the first time since his father that Model College will lift the sports trophy.

Cast 
 Aamir Khan as Sanjaylal Sharma  Sanju aka Sanjay Thapar
 Ayesha Jhulka as Anjali
 Deepak Tijori as Shekhar Malhotra
 Mamik Singh as Ratanlal Sharma a.k.a. Ratan
 Kiran Zaveri as Kalpana
 Sooraj Thapar as Shekhar Malhotra's friend
 Bobby Khanna as Shekhar Malhotra's friend
 Pooja Bedi as Devika
 Kulbhushan Kharbanda as Ramlal Sharma
 Aditya Lakhia as Maksood a.k.a. Ghode
 Deven Bhojani as Ghanshyam a.k.a. Ghanshu
 Asrani as Mr. Dubey (Model school teacher)
 Faisal Khan in a special appearance (College student)
 Imran Khan as Young Sanjaylal
 Sharokh Bharucha as Young Ratanlal
 Anjan Srivastav as Race commentator
 Ajit Vachani as Rajput's Principal
 Deb Mukherjee as Rajput's Coach
 Ravindra Kapoor as Shakoor Miyaan
 Jatin Pandit as Xavier's college student and performer at the college dance event
 Lalit Pandit as Xavier's college student and guitarist at college dance event
 Amol Gupte as cycle race commentator
 Girija Shettar as lead in the song "Jawa ho yaaron song" - Jo Jeeta Wohi Sikandar
 Ahmed Khan as Girdhari aka Anjali's Father
 Shehnaz Kudia as Rukhsana aka Devika's friend and classmate

Production 
The film was directed by Mansoor Khan, and written and produced by Nasir Hussain. Akshay Kumar had auditioned and Milind Soman was signed for Shekhar Malhotra's role, before Deepak Tijori played the role. Aditya Pancholi was selected to play the role of Ratan, but the role went to Mamik Singh, as confirmed by DNA.

The plot has similarities to the 1979 American film Breaking Away. However, Mansoor Khan stated that he only became aware of Breaking Away after the likeness was brought to his attention, some time after the release of Jo Jeeta Wohi Sikander. Both films have several similarities, including friendship, class barriers, bicycle racing, and parental relationship, but otherwise have different narratives, characters, motivations, treatment and racing rules.

Filming 
Though it is clearly mentioned in the introductory voice over that the movie is based in Dehradun (in fact, the first word spoken in the movie is "Dehradun"), it is mentioned twice in the movie (both times by the commentator during the cycle race) that it takes place in Kodaikanal. The movie has been shot predominantly in various locations in the south of India, primarily Kodaikanal. Soman had completed 75% of his scenes before being replaced by Tijori.

Music 

The music for the film was composed by Jatin–Lalit and the lyrics were penned by Majrooh Sultanpuri. The soundtrack, the second collaboration between Jatin and Lalit, helped to launch their careers. It was nominated for Best Music at the 1993 Filmfare Awards. "Pehla Nasha" was the fourth film song in Indian cinema (the first one being "Jogi O Jogi" from Lakhon Mein Ek (1971), followed by "Baare Baare" from Naagarahaavu (1972) and "Sundari Neeyum" from Michael Madana Kama Rajan (1990)) to be shot in complete slow motion. The technique was later used in many films and music videos. Pehla Nasha was the most popular track of the album and has become a cult song. Other popular tracks were "Humse Hai Sara Jahan", "Rooth Ke Humse" and "Arre Yaaron Mere Pyaaron". The song "Arre Yaaron Mere Pyaaron" was sung by Udit Narayan along with Vijeta Pandit.

Jo Jeeta Wohi Sikandar was the third best-selling Bollywood soundtrack album of 1992, having sold 2.5million units in India.

Release and reception

Box office 
In India, Jo Jeeta Wohi Sikandar net  and grossed , equivalent to  adjusted for inflation. The film opened to good responses, and was declared a hit at the box office. Jo Jeeta Wohi Sikander was also broadcast on Disney Channel India.

Critical reception 
In a review dated 29 May 1992, The Indian Express praised Najeeb Khan's photography, the sets and the performances of Aamir Khan, Ayesha Jhulka, and Pooja Bedi, but criticised Jatin–Lalit's music.

Awards 

 38th Filmfare Awards:

Won

 Best Film
 Best Editing – Zafar Sultan & Dilip Katalgi

Nominated

 Best Director – Mansoor Khan
Best Actor – Aamir Khan
Best Supporting Actress – Pooja Bedi
Best Music Director – Jatin–Lalit
Best Lyricist – Majrooh Sultanpuri for "Woh Sikandar Hi Doston"
Best Male Playback Singer – Udit Narayan for "Pehla Nasha"

References

External links 
 
 Facebook

1990s Hindi-language films
1990s sports films
1992 films
Cycling films
Films scored by Jatin–Lalit
Indian coming-of-age films
Indian sports films
Films shot in Kodaikanal
Films set in Dehradun